CaseLabs is a manufacturer of computer cases that was based in Canoga Park, Los Angeles, California. The company was founded in 1971 as a manufacturer of computer cases for electronic, military, medical, and industrial applications, and started making cases for the consumer market in late 2010.

CaseLabs allowed buyers to customize their purchases from their website by offering factory options. The company's cases used aluminum construction and were noted for their ability to house multiple radiators for liquid cooling.

CaseLabs announced that it was shutting down permanently in August 2018, citing Trump tariffs cutting into margins by "raising prices by almost 80%", and the "default of a large account". The company said it would not be able to fulfill all existing orders, but parts orders should ship to customers.

New Ownership 
On October 2, 2021, popular PC gaming news outlet GamersNexus reported the intellectual property of the bankrupt CaseLabs brand had been sold to a new owner.

References

1971 establishments in California
2018 disestablishments in California
American companies established in 1971
American companies disestablished in 2018
Computer companies established in 1971
Computer companies disestablished in 2018
Computer enclosure companies
Defunct computer companies of the United States
Manufacturing companies based in Los Angeles
Technology companies based in Greater Los Angeles